Crown Center is an unincorporated community in Adams Township, Morgan County, in the U.S. state of Indiana.

History
Crown Center was originally called Mount Tabor when it was founded. A post office was established at Crown Center in 1891, and remained in operation until 1905.

Geography

References

Unincorporated communities in Morgan County, Indiana
Unincorporated communities in Indiana
Indianapolis metropolitan area